Kevin Randall Clark  (born June 8, 1964) is a former professional American football defensive back and return specialist who played four seasons for the Denver Broncos in the National Football League. He played college football at San Jose State.

Coaching career
Clark currently coaches in the Denver area with the private coaching service, CoachUp.

References

1964 births
Living people
American football cornerbacks
American football return specialists
Denver Broncos players
Frankfurt Galaxy coaches
San Jose State Spartans football players
Players of American football from Sacramento, California
National Football League replacement players